Dawson County is a county located in the U.S. state of Montana. As of the 2020 census, the population was 8,940. Its county seat is Glendive.

History
Dawson County was the tenth county organized in Montana Territory. It was created January 15, 1869, four and a half years after Montana Territory was organized.   Before the formation of Dawson county, the area was the northern half of the original Big Horn County. Dawson takes its name from Major Andrew Dawson, manager of the Fort Benton Trading Post for the American Fur Company from 1856 to 1864.

Geography

Dawson County is located in the extreme eastern portion of Montana, about fifteen to twenty miles west of the Dakota line.

Dawson County contains part of Montana's badlands. Makoshika State Park is an example of that area's unusual rock formations. Dawson County's principal water sources are the Yellowstone River, which bisects its southeastern section, and the Redwater River in its northwest corner. Numerous creeks are tributary to these streams, furnishing abundant and accessible facilities watering livestock and for small irrigation enterprises and water conservation projects. In the upper bench lands, artesian well irrigation has received considerable attention.

The largest Triceratops skull ever found was discovered in 1992 and excavated in 2003 in Dawson County, Montana, in the famous Hell Creek Formation. It is a 65-million-year-old male Triceratops skull, 9.2 feet long, 5.2 feet high and 4.6 feet wide and weighing over 600kg. It has been dubbed 'Dragon King' and is understood to be the most expensive skull to ever trade privately. 

Parts of Dawson County were taken to form Valley County in 1893, Richland County and part of Wibaux County in 1914, part of Prairie County in 1915, and Garfield County and part of McCone County in 1919.

Major highways

  Interstate 94
  U.S. Highway 10 (Former)
  Montana Highway 16
  Montana Highway 200
  Montana Highway 200 (Alternate)
 Montana Highway 254

In 1920, Dawson County was traversed by the National Parks Highway or Red Trail, the Black Trail, the Green Trail and the Blue Trail, all of which passed through Glendive.

Adjacent counties

 Richland County - north
 Wibaux County - east
 Prairie County - south
 McCone County - west

Politics

Demographics

2000 census
As of the 2000 United States census, there were 9,059 people, 3,625 households, and 2,475 families living in the county. The population density was 4 people per square mile (1/km2). There were 4,168 housing units at an average density of 2 per square mile (1/km2). The racial makeup of the county was 97.43% White, 0.25% Black or African American, 1.23% Native American, 0.13% Asian, 0.01% Pacific Islander, 0.31% from other races, and 0.64% from two or more races.  0.89% of the population were Hispanic or Latino of any race. 39.7% were of German, 17.0% Norwegian, 7.3% Irish and 6.5% English ancestry. 97.0% spoke English, 1.4% German and 1.0% Spanish as their first language.

There were 3,625 households, out of which 29.70% had children under the age of 18 living with them, 58.50% were married couples living together, 6.80% had a female householder with no husband present, and 31.70% were non-families. 28.40% of all households were made up of individuals, and 12.20% had someone living alone who was 65 years of age or older. The average household size was 2.37 and the average family size was 2.90.

The county population contained 23.10% under the age of 18, 8.80% from 18 to 24, 24.90% from 25 to 44, 25.40% from 45 to 64, and 17.70% who were 65 years of age or older. The median age was 41 years. For every 100 females there were 98.30 males. For every 100 females age 18 and over, there were 99.90 males.

The median income for a household in the county was $31,393, and the median income for a family was $38,455. Males had a median income of $29,487 versus $18,929 for females. The per capita income for the county was $15,368. About 11.70% of families and 14.90% of the population were below the poverty line, including 18.70% of those under age 18 and 11.20% of those age 65 or over.

2010 census
As of the 2010 United States census, there were 8,966 people, 3,749 households, and 2,429 families living in the county. The racial makeup of the county was 95.7% white, 1.7% American Indian, 0.3% black or African American, 0.3% Asian, 0.3% from other races, and 1.6% from two or more races. Those of Hispanic or Latino origin made up 2.0% of the population. In terms of ancestry, 46.6% were German, 16.3% were Norwegian, 15.5% were Irish, 8.2% were English, and 6.5% were American.

Of the 3,749 households, 26.8% had children under the age of 18 living with them, 54.1% were married couples living together, 6.7% had a female householder with no husband present, 35.2% were non-families, and 31.2% of all households were made up of individuals. The average household size was 2.26 and the average family size was 2.82. The median age was 43.5 years.

The median income for a household in the county was $50,752 and the median income for a family was $63,982. Males had a median income of $45,222 versus $30,993 for females. The per capita income for the county was $24,602. About 7.4% of families and 9.3% of the population were below the poverty line, including 15.5% of those under age 18 and 9.6% of those age 65 or over.

Economy
Dawson County is known for its dryland grain, coal mines and gas and oil wells. There are 522 current farms and ranches, and 296 commercial businesses.

Lying in the heart of the western third of the Fort Union region, Dawson County is plentifully supplied with lignite coal. Local natural gas has supplied Glendive since at least 1920. Excellent clays for pottery and brick-making are also found in the county.

From early days, Dawson County was known as a splendid stock county, because of the native cover of a heavy and nutritious grass. Unlike some other parts of the state, the livestock industry did not die out. In the early 20th century, the county was known for pure-bred stock raising, dairying, and the production of hogs and poultry.

While there is some broken land around the Sheep Bluffs, in the northwestern part of the county, and east of the Yellowstone, smooth prairies and rolling land predominated in the county, making conditions excellent for farming purposes. The dark sandy loam soil, with a heavy clay subsoil, was a big producer.

The principal crops in the early years of the 20th century were barley, oats and wheat. Sixty per cent of the land was tillable, and the remainder afforded good grazing. As of 1920, the headgates of the Lower Yellowstone Irrigation Project, which irrigated approximately 90,000 acres, were located at Intake, in Dawson County, and further irrigation was planned. Unirrigated land was also producing excellent crops, with up to 400 bushels of potatoes in one acre of unirrigated land. In 1915, Dawson County won first and second prizes on Northwestern Dent corn at the St. Paul Corn Show, and in December of the following year, at the First National Corn Show, held at the same city, took first and second prizes and three third prizes. In 1920, it was estimated that the acreage planted in corn in Dawson County alone was as great as the corn acreage for the entire state in 1910.

Education
Dawson Community College is located in Glendive.

Communities

City
 Glendive (county seat)

Town
 Richey

Census-designated place
 West Glendive

Unincorporated communities
* Bloomfield
 Lindsay

See also
 List of lakes in Dawson County, Montana
 List of mountains in Dawson County, Montana
 National Register of Historic Places listings in Dawson County, Montana

Footnotes

Further reading
 Tom Stout (ed.), Montana, Its Story and Biography: A History of Aboriginal and Territorial Montana and Three Decades of Statehood: Volume 1. Chicago: American Historical Society, 1921.
 Our Lives, Our Times: Dawson County Family Stories. Glendive MT: Dawson County Tree Branches, 1989.

 
1869 establishments in Montana Territory
Populated places established in 1869